Junius Coston (born November 5, 1983) is a former American football guard. He was drafted by the Green Bay Packers in the fifth round of the 2005 NFL Draft. He played high school football at Needham B. Broughton High School and college football at North Carolina A&T.

Coston was also a member of the Oakland Raiders, Detroit Lions, Omaha Nighthawks, and Edmonton Eskimos.

External links
Just Sports Stats

1983 births
Living people
American football offensive tackles
American football offensive guards
Calgary Stampeders players
Detroit Lions players
Edmonton Elks players
Green Bay Packers players
North Carolina A&T Aggies football players
Oakland Raiders players
Omaha Nighthawks players
Players of American football from Raleigh, North Carolina
Needham B. Broughton High School alumni